Division No. 4, Subd. D is an unorganized subdivision on the island of Newfoundland in Newfoundland and Labrador, Canada. It is in Division No. 4.
According to the 2016 Statistics Canada Census:
Population: 860
% Change (2011 to 2016): +3.6
Dwellings: 646
Area: 1,149.70 km2
Density: 0.7 people/km2

Division No. 4, Subd. D includes the unincorporated communities of
Fox Island River
 Point au Mal

References

Newfoundland and Labrador subdivisions